Tropical Storm Jerry was a short-lived tropical storm that formed in the latter half of the 2001 Atlantic hurricane season. Forming as a tropical depression from a tropical wave on October 6 near Barbados, Jerry intensified into a tropical storm early the following day on October 7 while initially located under an environment of weak vertical wind shear. Shortly after entering the eastern Caribbean Sea, moderate upper-level wind shear affected Jerry's upper-level outflow, and the cyclone weakened to a depression shortly afterwards. Deterioration in organization continued, and Jerry dissipated while moving rapidly westward well south of Puerto Rico. Jerry caused minimal effects in the Lesser Antilles.

Meteorological history

A tropical wave moving westward off the African coast on October 1, 2001, entered the tropical Atlantic. The wave's organization changed little until October 4 as it moved westward, when curved banding features began to increase. However, little improvement in the wave's organization occurred until October 6 after continuing to move westward for two days, when an area of low pressure was identified by the National Hurricane Center. Afterward, the cloudiness became more concentrated, and the system organized into a tropical depression by noon on October 6, shortly after the first advisory from the NHC was issued at 11 a.m. AST.

At 5 p.m. AST later on October 6, the NHC noted that the depression was nearing tropical storm strength. Shortly after, a burst of heavy convective thunderstorms developed over the ill-defined low-level center, and as organization improved, the system was upgraded to  Tropical Storm Jerry around midnight on October 7. Jerry passed just south of Barbados at its peak intensity, followed by a slowing of forward speed and jog to the northwest as Jerry entered the Windward Islands early on October 8. Reconnaissance aircraft also indicated a possible reformation of the center, as data indicated multiple low-level rotations on a northeast to southwest axis.

Later, satellite observations indicated that the storm was poorly organized, with an elongated cloud mass and displaced secondary center to the northwest. Moderate vertical wind shear from the northwest developed, disrupting Jerry's upper-level outflow. Jerry continued to deteriorate, and later on October 8, aircraft data indicated the system had weakened into a broad area of low pressure with scattered squalls mainly to the east of the remnant center. Jerry then dissipated shortly afterward approximately 230 miles south of Puerto Rico, with the remnants moving westward.

Preparations and impact

Due to the tropical cyclone's short life, overall track errors in model guidance were not significant, and most models accurately indicated Jerry's westward to west-northwest course into the Caribbean Sea. Most models and official forecasts did not anticipate Jerry's dissipation, and numerous models indicated the system would reach hurricane status within two to three days under favorable conditions. Prior to Jerry's formation, a tropical storm watch was issued for Barbados at 5 p.m. EDT on October 6 because of forecasts that indicated the depression could intensify to tropical storm intensity. As the depression intensified to tropical storm status and moved closer to the Windward Islands, a tropical storm watch was issued for Tobago by the government of the island nation and for nearby Grenada by the Trinidad and Tobago Meteorological Service at 5 a.m. EDT on October 7. A tropical storm warning was issued for Barbados at 8 a.m. EDT.

Jerry caused minimal damage as it moved through the Windward Islands and Lesser Antilles. The outer bands of Jerry delivered light rainfall to Grenada on October 8, but no damage was reported. Some downpours and high winds were reported. No ships reported tropical storm-force winds, though Barbados reported a minimum pressure of 1007 mb.

References

External links
NHC advisory archive on Tropical Storm Jerry

Jerry
Jerry (2001)
Jerry (2001)
Jerry (2001)
Jerry (2001)
Jerry (2001)
Jerry (2001)
Jerry